Genius is a 2018 Indian Hindi-language romantic psychological spy action thriller film directed by Anil Sharma. It marks the debut of his son Utkarsh Sharma as a male lead, who also featured as a child actor in Sharma's 2001 film Gadar: Ek Prem Katha, Ishita Chauhan and Mithun Chakraborty, with Ayesha Jhulka, Nawazuddin Siddiqui and Malti Chahar play supporting roles in the film.

Plot
The film starts with Vasudev Shastri, a genius RAW (Research and Analysis Wing) agent, being labelled as incompetent because he had failed in an important mission and got himself too injured to work again. Later, when he sits by a park depressed, Nandini, the love of his life, consoles him. The film then goes into a flashback where Vasudev Shastri who is a topper yet charming man who comes to IIT where the second ranker, Nandini Chauhan, out of jealousy, decides to make his life hell. She constantly detests him, but Vasu outsmarts her every time. Besides being the friendly "genius" around campus, he secretly uses his hacking talent working part time for RAW.

The day before the final exam in IIT, Nandini reluctantly visits Vasu to get help regarding a theorem. There, Vasu admits to Nandini that he had been long in love with her. Hearing this, Nandini immediately hatches a cunning plan and gives Vasu sleeping pills so that he is unable to attend the exam the next day. However, Vasu outsmarts her this time as well and reaches the exam hall before her. Vasu doesn't at all seem angry with her and instead helps her with an unexpected glitch and walks away smiling after completing his paper. On the day of the results, Nandini learns that Vasu had intentionally submitted a blank paper just to let her top. Seeing his dedication towards love, Nandini madly falls in love with him but doesn't reveal it and flies off to the US for her dream job.

On the other hand, senior members of RAW, impressed by Vasu's intelligence, try to convince him to join RAW. After learning that his parents were killed in communal riots planned by ISI of Pakistan, Vasu finally decides to join RAW to take revenge against ISI. The film returns to the present, where Vasu, who is labelled incompetent by RAW, uses a walking stick and suffers from acute tinnitus and several injuries since his failed mission.

Nandini had taken a break from her job to return to India and take care of Vasu. She takes Vasu to her house in Puducherry, where her mother is pleasantly surprised to see Nandini (who had never valued personal relationships before her career) make huge sacrifices for Vasu's welfare. Vasu and Nandini spend some romantic moments, but their happiness is short lived as Vasu starts having hallucinations about his failed mission.

A confused Nandini tries to take Vasu to the US for treatment. Vasu refuses and narrates the tragic story of his failed mission to Nandini, after which he leaves to track MRS, the mastermind of ISI in India and the prime target of his failed mission. Soon after, it is shown that all the hallucinations were just a drama set up by Vasu to track his enemies. He, one by one, kills everyone who had helped MRS. On the other hand, MRS senses Vasudev's return and plans to kill him in a masquerade party. In the masquerade party, Vasu saves himself but gets injured once again. Seeing Vasu's miserable condition, Nandini breaks down. MRS, who was secretly observing them, takes advantage of this and kidnaps Nandini. Soon after, the senior members of RAW acknowledge his competence. With the help of RAW, Vasu finds Nandini, saves Mathura from a huge blast and finally kills MRS by drowning him in the river. All members of RAW praise him. The film ends with him sharing a big hug with Nandini.

Cast
 Mithun Chakraborthy as NSA Chief Jaishankar Prasad
 Anirban mitra    as NSA Officer Bablu 
 Utkarsh Sharma as Vasudev Shastri aka Genius, Nandini's love interest
 Ishitha Chauhan as Nandini Chauhan, Vasudev's love interest
 Malti Chahar as Rubina, RAW Agent.
 Nawazuddin Siddiqui as Mr Samar Khan / MRS, an ISI agent and the main antagonist
 Ayesha Jhulka as Nandini's mother
 KK Raina as Mr Das
 Zakir Hussain as Minister
 Abhimanyu Singh as Mr. Praveen Joshi
 Arjun Dwivedi  as Saleem
 Dev Gill as Mr. Rajiv Ranjan, MRS' mole in RAW
 Ashok Samarth as Commander Arjun Singh Rathore
 Rajesh Bhati as Samar Khan right hand

Reception 
The film received generally poor reviews. Reviews were particularly critical of the confusing narrative and the standard of acting.  Bollywood Hungama gave it 1/5 stars saying, "On the whole, GENIUS is an extremely poor and senseless fare." Ronak Kotecha of The Times of India was equally critical of the film giving it 2/5 stars. The Indian Express gave it a "nil" rating describing it as feeling redundant.

Soundtrack

The music of the film is composed by Himesh Reshammiya,"Tera Fitoor" and "Dil Meri Na Sune" two of the most hits song of 2018  and Monty Sharma composed the background score, while lyrics are penned by Manoj Muntashir, Kumaar, and Shabbir Ahmed. The first song of the film "Tera Fitoor", which is sung by Arijit Singh was released on 12 July 2018 . The album was released on 9 August 2018 by Tips Music.

References

External links
 
 

2018 films
2010s Hindi-language films
Films scored by Himesh Reshammiya
2018 action thriller films
Indian action thriller films
Films about the Research and Analysis Wing
Films directed by Anil Sharma
India–Pakistan relations in popular culture
Films set in Islamabad
Films set in Pakistan
Military of Pakistan in films